Thamel is a commercial neighborhood located in Kathmandu, the capital of Nepal. Thamel has been the centre of the tourist industry in Kathmandu for over four decades, starting from the hippie days, when many artists came to Nepal and spent weeks in Thamel. It is considered as the hotspot for tourism inside the Kathmandu valley.

Thamel is known by its narrow alleys crowded with various shops and vendors. Commonly sold goods include food, fresh vegetables/fruits, pastries, trekking gear, walking gear, music, DVDs, handicrafts, souvenirs, woolen items and clothes. Travel agencies, small grocery stores, budget hotels, restaurants, pubs and clubs also line the streets. Cars, cycle rickshaws, two-wheelers and taxis ply these narrow streets alongside hundreds of pedestrians.

Many restaurants in Thamel serve traditional and continental cuisine. Thamel also acts as the pre-base camp for mountaineers. It boasts a wide range of mountaineering gear shops, foreign money exchange booths, mobile phone shops, along with the numerous travel agents and guest houses.

Thamel is widely regarded as the center of Kathmandu's nightlife and is also popular for its wide range of restaurants and cafés, live music and other attractions frequented by both tourists and locals. 

On 28 September 2011, Thamel was declared a full Wi-Fi zone. It is the first Wi-Fi zone of Nepal. 

The places near Thamel are Kwabahal, JP Road, Paknajol, Sanchaya Kosh road.

See also 
Hippie trail

References

External links
 Thamel Tourism Development Council 

Tourism in Nepal
Neighbourhoods in Kathmandu